Fremont County is a county in the U.S. state of Wyoming. As of the 2020 United States Census, the population was 39,234, making it the fifth-most populous county in Wyoming. Its county seat is Lander. The county was founded in 1884 and is named for John C. Frémont, a general, explorer, and politician. It is roughly the size of the state of Vermont.

Fremont County comprises the Riverton, WY Micropolitan Statistical Area.

History
Fremont County was created on March 5, 1884 by the legislature of the Wyoming Territory. The county was created with land ceded by Sweetwater County. In 1890, Big Horn County was carved out of Fremont, Johnson, and Sheridan Counties. Hot Springs County was created in 1911 from parts of Fremont, Big Horn, and Park counties. In 1921, Sublette County was created from parts of Fremont and Lincoln counties, leaving Fremont County's boundary at its present configuration.

Fremont County was named for John Charles Frémont, an explorer of the American West, United States Senator from California, and 1856 Republican presidential candidate. Fremont County is the site of the Wind River Indian Reservation, home of the Eastern Shoshone and Northern Arapaho tribes of Native Americans.

Geography
It is the second-largest county by area in Wyoming, as well as in the six Rocky Mountain States. Elevations and climate range from desert at Boysen State Park to glaciers at  Gannett Peak, the highest point not only in Wyoming but in the three Central Rockies states of Wyoming, Idaho and Montana. The southern end of the county is traversed by the Oregon Trail and in the northwest corner lies Dubois, a gateway town for Yellowstone National Park and Grand Teton National Park. Although the county seat is Lander, the largest community is Riverton, home of Central Wyoming College and the economic hub of the region. A large portion of the western edge of the county follows the Continental Divide at the crest of the Wind River Range of the Rocky Mountains, known for its wilderness areas and home of the largest glaciers in the American Rocky Mountains.

Adjacent counties

Major Highways
  U.S. Highway 20
  U.S. Highway 26
  U.S. Highway 287
  Wyoming Highway 28
  Wyoming Highway 131
  Wyoming Highway 132
  Wyoming Highway 133
  Wyoming Highway 134
  Wyoming Highway 135
  Wyoming Highway 136
  Wyoming Highway 137
  Wyoming Highway 138

National protected areas
Bridger National Forest (part)
Shoshone National Forest (part)
Teton National Forest (part)
The Bridger National Forest and the Teton National Forest have been administratively combined into the Bridger-Teton National Forest. Fremont County contains portions of both originally-designated forests.

Demographics

2000 census
As of the 2000 United States Census, there were 35,804 people, 13,545 households, and 9,481 families in Fremont County. The population density was 4 people per square mile (2/km2). There were 15,541 housing units at an average density of 2 per square mile (1/km2). The racial makeup was 76.49% White, 0.12% Black or African American, 19.68% Native American, 0.30% Asian, 0.03% Pacific Islander, 1.16% from other races, and 2.21% from two or more races. 4.37% of the population were Hispanic or Latino of any race. 22.1% were of German, 9.9% English, 8.2% Irish and 6.3% American ancestry.

There were 13,545 households, out of which 32.20% had children under the age of 18 living with them, 54.30% were married couples living together, 10.90% had a female householder with no husband present, and 30.00% were non-families. 25.50% of all households were made up of individuals, and 10.00% had someone living alone who was 65 years of age or older. The average household size was 2.58 and the average family size was 3.10.

The county population contained 27.40% under the age of 18, 8.30% from 18 to 24, 25.90% from 25 to 44, 25.00% from 45 to 64, and 13.30% who were 65 years of age or older. The median age was 38 years. For every 100 females there were 98.20 males. For every 100 females age 18 and over, there were 95.40 males.

The median income for a household in the county was $32,503, and the median income for a family was $37,983. Males had a median income of $30,620 versus $19,802 for females. The per capita income for the county was $16,519.  About 13.30% of families and 17.60% of the population were below the poverty line, including 23.70% of those under age 18 and 12.50% of those age 65 or over.

2010 census
As of the 2010 United States Census, there were 40,123 people, 15,455 households, and 10,360 families residing in the county. The racial makeup of the county was 74.3% white, 21.2% American Indian, 0.4% Asian, 0.3% black or African American, 1.0% from other races, and 2.8% from two or more races. Those of Hispanic or Latino origin made up 5.6% of the population. In terms of ancestry, 21.7% were German, 13.5% were English, 12.2% were Irish, and 7.7% were American.

Of the 15,455 households, 32.3% had children under the age of 18 living with them, 49.3% were married couples living together, 12.2% had a female householder with no husband present, 33.0% were non-families, and 27.0% of all households were made up of individuals. The average household size was 2.54 and the average family size was 3.07. The median age was 38.5 years.

The median income for a household in the county was $46,397 and the median income for a family was $55,531. Males had a median income of $44,087 versus $27,751 for females. The per capita income for the county was $24,173. About 10.3% of families and 14.0% of the population were below the poverty line, including 20.7% of those under age 18 and 6.4% of those age 65 or over.

Government and infrastructure
The Wyoming Department of Corrections Wyoming Honor Farm is located in Riverton. The Wyoming Department of Health Wyoming Life Resource Center (WLRC), originally the Wyoming State Training School (WSTS), a residential facility for physically and mentally disabled people, is located in Lander. Both facilities were operated by the Wyoming Board of Charities and Reform until that agency was dissolved as a result of a state constitutional amendment passed in November 1990.

Fremont County voters have been reliably Republican for decades. Since 1936, in only one national election did the county voters select the Democratic Party candidate (as of 2020).

Communities

Cities
Lander (county seat)
Riverton

Towns

Dubois
Hudson
Pavillion
Shoshoni

Census-designated places

Arapahoe
Atlantic City
Boulder Flats
Crowheart
Ethete
Fort Washakie
Jeffrey City
Johnstown

Unincorporated communities

 Dunoir
Kinnear
 Lost Cabin
Lysite
 Midval
 Moneta
St. Stephens
 Sand Draw
South Pass City
Sweetwater Crossing (Sweetwater Station)
 Willow Creek

Former communities
Miner's Delight (Hamilton City)

See also

National Register of Historic Places listings in Fremont County, Wyoming
Wyoming
List of cities and towns in Wyoming
List of counties in Wyoming
Wyoming statistical areas

In popular culture
In his poem The Ballad of Jesus Ortiz, Dana Gioia describes how his great-grandfather, a Mexican immigrant from Sonora, worked as a Wild West cow-puncher and was later murdered by a disgruntled and racist patron while working as a saloon keeper in the Fremont County town of Lost Cabin, Wyoming in 1910.

The movie Wind River is set on the Wind River Indian Reservation, which is inside Fremont County.

Scenes from the movie Taking Chance were set in Dubois, a town within Fremont County.  The real-life Chance Phelps from the film was born in Riverton and is buried in Dubois, both in Fremont County.

References

 
1884 establishments in Wyoming Territory
Populated places established in 1884